George Henry Longman (3 August 1852 – 19 August 1938) was an English first-class cricketer. Longman was a right-handed batsman who played occasionally as a wicketkeeper.

Early life and education
Longman was educated at Eton College, where he represented the college cricket team. Longman captained the college in 1871. Longman was later educated at Trinity College, Cambridge, where he represented the university cricket team.

Longman made his first-class debut for Cambridge University in 1872 against the Marylebone Cricket Club. Longman represented the university in 27 first-class matches from 1872 to 1875, with his final match for the university coming against Oxford University at Lord's. In his 27 matches for the University Longman scored 1,019 runs at a batting average of 22.15, with four half centuries and a high score of 80 against Oxford University in 1872. In the field he took 11 catches and while keeping wicket he made a single stumping.

Professional career
In 1875 Longman made his debut for Hampshire against Sussex. Longman represented Hampshire in 27 first-class matches, with his final first-class match coming against Sussex in 1885, the year that Hampshire lost their first-class status until the 1895 County Championship. In his 27 appearances for Hampshire, Longman scored 856 runs at an average of 17.46, with four half centuries and a high score of 78 against Surrey in 1884. In the field he took 20 catches and made 3 stumpings.

In 1877 Longman made his debut for the Marylebone Cricket Club against Cambridge University. Longman played four match for the club, with his final appearance coming in 1881 against Cambridge University. In his four matches for the club Longman scored 135 runs at an average of 19.28, with a single half century score of 58 against Oxford University in 1878.

As well as representing the above teams in first-class cricket, Longman also represented the Gentlemen of England against Cambridge University in 1876. It was during this match that Longman made his highest first-class score of 98. He also played for the Gentlemen in seven Gentlemen v Players fixtures. In addition Longman played one match each for the Gentlemen of the South and the South of England.

In Longman's overall first-class career he scored 2,448 runs at an average of 20.57, with 11 half centuries and a high score of 98. With the ball he took three wickets at a bowling average of 60.00. In the field Longman took 41 catches and made 4 stumpings.

Later life
After his retirement from first-class cricket, Longman was the master of Surrey Union Foxhounds. Later he served as the President of Surrey County Cricket Club from 1926 to 1928 and later as Honorary Treasurer from 1929 until his death. Longman was also a member of Longmans, Green & Co. Longman died at Wimbledon Common, Surrey, on 19 August 1938.

Family
Longman's son Henry played first-class cricket for Cambridge University, Surrey, Middlesex and the Marylebone Cricket Club.

References

External links
George Longman at Cricinfo
George Longman at CricketArchive
Matches and detailed statistics for George Longman

1852 births
1938 deaths
People educated at Eton College
Alumni of Trinity College, Cambridge
English cricketers
Cambridge University cricketers
Hampshire cricketers
Gentlemen cricketers
North v South cricketers
Marylebone Cricket Club cricketers
Gentlemen of the South cricketers
Gentlemen of England cricketers